Yopurga County is a county in northern Kashgar Prefecture, Xinjiang Uyghur Autonomous Region. More than 96% of the residents of the county are Uyghurs and live around oases at the western edge of the desolate Taklamakan Desert. The county is bordered to the north by Jiashi County, to the east by Maralbexi County, to the west by Shule County, to the southwest by Yengisar County and to the south by Yarkant County.

Name
Yopurga County is named for the Yopurga River.

History
In the Qing Dynasty, the area was part of Shule as Yopurga Zhuang.

In 1940, Yopurga Shezhiju was created from portions of Shule County, Yengisar County, and Jiashi County. In 1943, Yopurga was made a county.

On October 20, 2014, Terim (Tieremu) Township became Terim Town.

On July 24, 2015, Yekshenbebazar (Yekexian Baibazha) was changed from a township to a town.

Geography
Dawakol (Dawakun) National Desert Park is located in Yopurga County.

Climate

Administrative divisions
, Yopurga County included four towns, five townships and two other areas:

Towns ( / )
Yopurga Town (Yopurgha, Yuepuhu;  / ), Eshme (Aiximan, Aiximai;  /  / ), Terim (Tieremu;  / , formerly  / ), Yekshenbebazar (Yekexian Baibazha;  / , formerly  / )
Townships ( / )
Yopurga Township (Yopurgha, Yuepuhu;  / ), Aqqik Township (Aqike, Achchiq, A-ch'i-k'o;  / ), Siyek Township (Seyeke;  / ), Bayawat Township (Bayi'awati;  / ), Axunluqum Township (Ahong Lukumu, Ahonglukumu;  / )
Other areas
Yopurga Dairy Farm, Regiment 42

Economy
Agricultural products include wheat, cotton, corn, muskmelon, and oilseed products. Beekeeping is relatively developed. Herding is important, primarily sheep herding. Industries include cotton and hemp processing, food and oil processing, and concrete.

Farmers in the county raise donkeys for meat, milk and donkey-hide gelatin.

In July 1953, Yopurga County was reported to have 87,000 mou of winter and spring wheat.

Demographics

In 1997, Uyghurs made up 94.6% of the county's population.

, the population of Yopurga County was 96.1% Uyghur and 3.9% Han Chinese. As of 2015, 167,860 of the 177,955 residents of the county were Uyghur, 9,801 were Han Chinese and 294 were from other ethnic groups.

As of 1999, 94.68% of the population of Yopurga (Yuepuhu) County was Uyghur and 5.28% of the population was Han Chinese.

Historical maps
Historical English-language maps including modern-day Yopurga County area:

Notes

References

External links
 Donkey Competitions Kick off in Northwest China's Xinjiang

County-level divisions of Xinjiang
Kashgar Prefecture